Aquamicrobium aestuarii is a gram-negative, catalase- and oxidase-positive strictly aerobic, motile bacteria with a flagellum from the genus of Aquamicrobium which was isolated from the Yellow Sea in South Korea.

References

External links
Type strain of Aquamicrobium aestuarii at BacDive -  the Bacterial Diversity Metadatabase

Phyllobacteriaceae
Bacteria described in 2013